Games People Play is an NBC reality television series that ran from 1980 to 1981, hosted by Bryant Gumbel, with celebrity and athlete co-hosts such as Cyndy Garvey, Mike Adamle, and Johnny Bench. The format centers on unusual sports competitions, including guzzling beer, a belly flop contest and a taxicab demolition derby. Celebrities of film, TV, and sports were frequent guest participants on the show as well. Originally previewed in April 1980 as The Sunday Games, the format was inspired by another NBC show Real People, which had recurring segments featuring similar competitions and displays of unusual skills.

The series is noted for popularizing Mr. T, who won the "America's Best Bouncer" (sometimes reported as "World's Toughest Bouncer") competition twice on the show, donating his $3000 prize to charity. Mr. T was subsequently cast by Sylvester Stallone as Clubber Lang, the villain in Rocky III.

The title of the show is a play on the title of Games People Play, a popular psychology book from the 1960s about mind games and interactions within relationships.

Reception
Critical reception was negative, described as ranging "from dismissive to disdainful". People contributor Scott Veale described Games People Play as "NBC's laughable 'trashsport' show".

Nielsen ratings for the show were moderately high when the season began, attributed to a delay in scripted television production due to a 1980 Hollywood actor's strike which put the show against a number of reruns and made-for-TV movies. The show's ratings fell quickly though after new shows returned, leading to its cancellation announcement in December 1980.

References

External links

NBC original programming
American sports television series
1980s American reality television series
1980 American television series debuts
1981 American television series endings
NBC Sports